The 2008 Roewe Shanghai Masters was a professional ranking snooker tournament that took place between 29 September and 5 October 2008 at the Shanghai Grand Stage in Shanghai, China. It was the second ranking event of the 2008/2009 season and was the second annual edition of the tournament.

Former World Champion Graeme Dott withdrew from the competition after breaking his left arm on 30 September, during an informal football match with other snooker players. As a result, Jamie Cope, who was due to play Dott in the first round, received a bye to the last 16, where he made the 64th official maximum break against Mark Williams.

Qualifier Ricky Walden won in the final 10–8 against World Champion Ronnie O'Sullivan to win his first ranking title.

Prize fund
The breakdown of prize money for this year is shown below:

Winner: £52,000
Runner-up: £25,000
Semi-final: £12,500
Quarter-final: £6,725
Last 16: £5,000
Last 32: £3,450
Last 48: £2,050
Last 64: £1,400

Stage one highest break: £500
Stage two highest break: £2,000
Stage one maximum break: £1,000
Stage two maximum break: £20,000
Total: £282,000

Wildcard round
These matches were played in Shanghai on 29 September.

Main draw

Final

Qualifying rounds
These matches took place from 2 to 5 September 2008 at Pontins in Prestatyn, Wales.

Century breaks

Qualifying stage centuries

130  Lee Spick
121  James McBain
116  Jin Long
112  Matthew Selt

110  Paul Davison
107  Liu Song
105  Andy Hicks
101  Andrew Norman

Televised stage centuries

147  Jamie Cope
145, 141, 108, 106, 100  Ronnie O'Sullivan
139, 105, 104, 101  Ricky Walden
139  Ian Preece
137  Fergal O'Brien
136, 134  John Higgins
135  Judd Trump
128  Mark Williams
127, 104  Andy Hicks
127  Atthasit Mahitthi
125, 107, 106  Tom Ford
120, 116, 115, 114  Stuart Pettman

119  Nigel Bond
114, 101  Stephen Maguire
114  Jamie Burnett
114  Peter Ebdon
108  Gerard Greene
106, 105  Joe Perry
105  Liang Wenbo
105  Mark Selby
103  Stuart Bingham
103  Barry Hawkins
102  Jimmy White

References

2008
Shanghai Masters
Shanghai Masters